
Lac de Louvie is a lake above Fionnay in the canton of Valais, Switzerland.

The Lac de Louvie is paradise for all nature lovers such as trail runners and hikers.

See also
List of mountain lakes of Switzerland

References

External links

Louvie